Gabriel, Come Back (Finnish: Gabriel, tule takaisin) is a 1951 Finnish comedy film directed by Valentin Vaala and starring Tarmo Manni, Emma Väänänen and Salli Karuna.

Cast
 Tarmo Manni as Gabriel Vihervuori  
 Emma Väänänen as Kristina Anger  
 Salli Karuna as Ulrika Anger  
 Ansa Ikonen as Rosa Pakkala  
 Ilmi Parkkari as Raili  
 Sakari Jurkka as Eero 
 Holger Blommila 
 Kaarlo Halttunen 
 Kaisu Hele 
 Maire Hyvönen
 Yrjö Ikonen 
 Sinikka Ilmén 
 Varma Lahtinen 
 Aurora Lindström 
 Uolevi Lönnberg 
 Erkki Pellinen 
 Rafael Pihlaja 
 Pirkko Raitio 
 Sylva Rossi 
 Kalle Rouni 
 Sirkka Sipilä 
 Anton Soini 
 Annie Sundman 
 Olga Tainio 
 Onni Timonen 
 Satu Unho 
 Elli Ylimaa

References

Bibliography 
 Pietari Kääpä. Directory of World Cinema: Finland. Intellect Books, 2012.

External links 
 

1951 films
1951 comedy films
Finnish comedy films
1950s Finnish-language films
Films based on works by Mika Waltari
Films directed by Valentin Vaala
Finnish black-and-white films